Jim Torrey (born 1940) is an American politician who served as mayor of Eugene from 1997 to 2004. Torrey was nominated in 2006 for an Oregon State Senate seat, but was defeated by incumbent Vicki Walker. He then served was elected to the Eugene School Board as Representative 5 in 2007, but was defeated by Shabram Martina in 2019. Torrey was first elected to public office at the age of 21, when he won a seat on the Waldport, Oregon city council.

Torrey was a member of the Oregon Republican Party from age 21 until age 67; in 2007, he switched his registration to the newly formed Independent Party of Oregon.

Early life and career

Jim Torrey was born in 1940 and grew up in Waldport, Oregon. After graduating from Waldport High School in 1958, he spent a year at the University of Oregon majoring in business but did not graduate. He then worked in advertising and workers' compensation.

Mayoral tenure

Torrey's mayoral tenure was marked by allegations of police brutality against Eugene citizens.

Shortly after his election in 1997, Torrey's Eugene police sprayed pepper spray at environmentalist peaceful  protestors during a confrontation at a downtown parking garage, after which the city had to settle payments with those who they injured. On August 6th, 1997, a protestor vomited on Torrey at a Eugene City Council meeting. 

On June 18th, 1999, Eugene police used tear gas on an anti-capitalist protest, which affected over 200 people and arrested 20 demonstrators. Citizens claimed that the mayor had directed police to needlessly harass individuals in black clothing.

2008 mayoral candidacy
Torrey ran again for mayor of Eugene in 2008. He qualified for a runoff election in November of that year, but lost to incumbent Kitty Piercy. Torrey's decision as a former two-term mayor to challenge a first term was described as an "unprecedented contest" in Eugene politics.

Post-mayoral career

After his time as mayor, Torrey unsuccessfully ran for the Oregon State Senate in 2006 as the Republican nominee. He was then elected Eugene School Board Representative 5 as an Independent Party of Oregon member in 2007. He served three terms before being defeated in 2019 by Shabram Martina, an educator.

References

External links
Oregon Voters' Guide
Independent Party of Oregon

Living people
Mayors of Eugene, Oregon
Oregon city council members
Oregon Republicans
Independent Party of Oregon politicians
School board members in Oregon
1940 births
People from Lincoln County, Oregon